The September When is a Norwegian rock band.

History 
The band was formed in Stavanger in 1987, by vocalist Morten Abel, guitarist Tor Øyvind Syvertsen and keyboardist Helge Hummervoll, all former members of the band Mods. They signed a recording contract with Warner Music in Norway, and released their self-titled debut album in 1989. The band line-up was broadened by the addition of bassist Gulleiv Wee and drummer Stene Osmundsen before the following tour. Syvertsen left the band the following year, and Morten Mølster took his place.

The new line-up released their break-through album Mother I've Been Kissed in 1991. After releasing two more albums, One Eye Open in 1993 and HuggerMugger in 1994, The September When split up in 1996. The same year they released the compilation Absolute The September When - Prestige de la Norvège 1989-96. Another compilation, The Best Of TSW, got released in 2002 and contains remastered songs.

According to the Morten Abel website, The September When reunited for a show on August 28, 2008, in Stavanger, Norway.
The band returned with a fifth studio album "Judas Kiss" on December 5, 2008. Guitarist Morten Mølster died on January 14, 2013.

Band members

Last line-up
Morten Abel - vocals, acoustic guitar, electric guitar, harmonica (1987–96)
Morten Mølster - electric guitar (1990–96)
Torkild Viig - bass (1994–96)
Stene Osmundsen - drums and percussion (1990–96)
Helge Hummervoll - keyboards (1987–96)

Former members
Tor Øyvind Syvertsen - electric guitar (1987–90)
Gulleiv Wee - bass (1990–94)

Discography

Albums
The September When (1989)
Mother I've Been Kissed (1991)
One Eye Open (1993)
HuggerMugger (1994)
Judas Kiss (2008)

EPs
Mortal (1989)
Bullet Me (1991)
Mama Won't To Tell You No Lie (1991)
Roundabout... Now (1991)
Cries Like A Baby (1994)
Sometimes Serious (1994)
I Can Take It (1994)
Daydreaming (1996)

Compilations
Absolute The September When - Prestige de la Norvège 1989-96 (1996)
The Best Of TSW (2002)

Norwegian rock music groups
Norwegian pop music groups
Musical groups established in 1987
1987 establishments in Norway
Musical groups disestablished in 1996
1996 disestablishments in Norway
Musical groups reestablished in 2008
Musical groups from Stavanger